Nicholas Wadley (30 April 1935 - 1 November 2017) was a British art critic, art historian, biographer, cartoonist and illustrator.

Biography

He was born in Elstree, Hertfordshire, the youngest child of Kitty, an administrator at the Bank of England, and Wilfred Wadley, an accountant for the RAF. He was educated at Reed’s School, in Cobham, Surrey, and graduated in fine art at Kingston School of Art in 1956, did National Service in the R.A.F., and graduated in art history at the Courtauld Institute   in London in 1961. With his first wife, Pauline, he had two children, Caroline and Chris.
From 1962 to  1985 he taught at Chelsea School of Art, as head of art history after 1970, and took early retirement in 1985. He was a friend  of Stefan and Franciszka Themerson and an admirer of their work, which he wrote on extensively. He later married Franciszka Themerson's niece, Jasia Reichardt.
After his retirement, Nick - as he became as an illustrator - published many cartoons and drawings

Books
 Michelangelo (1965)
 Manet (1967)
 The Drawings of Van Gogh (1969)
 Cubism (1972) 
 Cézanne and His Art (1975)
 Gauguin (1979)
 Noa Noa, Gauguin's Tahiti (1985)
 Impressionist & Post-Impressionist Drawing (1991)

Illustrated Books

 Nick Wadley’s Guide to British Artists (2003)
 Man + Dog (2009)
 Man + Doctor (2012)
 Blue Owl (2014)
 Man + Table  (2016)
 Man + Book (2018)

Exhibition Catalogues
 Modern British Watercolours (1964)
 Jacques Lipchitz, Sculptures and Drawings (1973)
 Seymour Lipton, Recent Work (1974)
 Henri Matisse (1978)
 Jacques Lipchitz, Sculptures and Drawings from the Cubist Epoch (1978)
 Barbara Hepworth. Carvings and Bronzes (1979)
 Rufino Tamayo (1979)
 John Davies, Recent Sculpture and     Drawings (1980)
 Kurt Schwitters in Exile, the Latev Work 1937-48 (1981)
 Gwyther Irwin, A Retrospective (1987)
 Renoir: a retrospective (1987)
 The Drawings of Franciszka Themerson (1991)

References 

British art critics
British art historians
British cartoonists
1935 births
2017 deaths
Alumni of the Courtauld Institute of Art
People educated at Reed's School